The Chico Enterprise-Record is the daily newspaper of Chico, California. Also known as the E-R, the newspaper was first published in Bidwell Bar, California as the Butte Record in 1853 and is now part of the MediaNews Group corporation, who took control of the paper from Donrey in 1999. Donrey had owned the paper since March 14, 1983.

The paper has a circulation of less than 10,000 and also publishes supplements, like "The North Valley Employment Guide", "The 
Real Estate Guide", "HomeStyle Magazine." Editions of the Enterprise-Record include the Oroville Mercury-Register.

Throughout its history as the Enterprise-Record, the newspaper has never missed a scheduled publication day. There have been several challenges to that accomplishment, including an earthquake in August 1975 which knocked out power to the newspaper's offices for several hours. The shock measured 5.7 ML and had a maximum Mercalli intensity of VIII (Severe), causing $3 million in damage and injuring 10.

History

The Enterprise-Record is the result of the merger of the Chico Enterprise and the Chico Record on Dec. 6, 1948. Both predecessor publications had a long and storied history throughout the north valley of the Sacramento River.

The Chico Record can trace its roots to the Butte Record. The Butte Record moved publication from Bidwell Bar to Oroville in 1856 where it was briefly known as the Oroville Union Record from 1864 to 1866. The publication would relocate to Chico in 1873 and after the acquisition of the Chico Chronicle became the Chico Morning Chronicle-Record. The name was winnowed back to Chico Record after new owners purchased the paper in 1897.

The Chico Enterprise originated in 1859 as the Tehama Tocsin in Tehama, California. It relocated to Red Bluff, California and, later, to Chico where it was renamed the Northern Enterprise. The name was later shorted to the Enterprise.

The Enterprise and the Record were among many newspapers that were published in Chico in the 1860s. Other publications included the Chico Index, Chico Courant and the California Caucasian. The Caucasian was reportedly a central force in fomenting the atmosphere of hate and bigotry which led to the burning of Chico's then-"Chinatown" in 1877 (https://web.archive.org/web/20110718035004/http://www.what-you-see.com/calif/chico.htm).

Ultimately, the Enterprise and the Record emerged as Chico's two primary newspapers. They competed against each other through the 1940s. They published together for the first time in a single combined edition in October 1946 due to a printer's strike.

The Enterprise and the Record consolidated ownership in Nov. 13, 1947 when Record owners, Stanley and Samuel Beaubaire, sold their paper to the Chico Enterprise. Enterprise Publishing Co. published separate editions of the Enterprise and the Record until Dec. 6, 1948 when they were merged into the Chico Enterprise-Record.

After merging, the paper was published in the afternoons Monday through Friday and on Saturday mornings. The newspaper's office and printing presses were at 700 Broadway.

On March 14, 1983, more than a century of local ownership ended when the publication was sold to Donrey Media Group of Fort Smith, Ark. One change was the introduction of a Sunday morning edition on Oct. 30, 1983. The E-R shifted to an entirely morning newspaper on Sept. 8, 1992.

The Enterprise-Record also moved its operation to its current offices and printing presses at 400 E. Park Ave. on Aug. 22, 1987. The ribbon cutting included Butte County Supervisor Jane Dolan, Chico Mayor Mary Andrews and Donrey founder Donald W. Reynolds.

National Influence and Coverage 
In November 2018, the editor of the Enterprise-Record took a photo of Camp Fire, then consuming Paradise, California. The iconic photograph, taken with an iPhone camera, appeared on the websites of the New York Times, Washington Post, and Time magazine. The Los Angeles Times would later run an article detailing the efforts taken by the little paper to cover the tragedy, recognizing the staff for performing at "the highest of levels."

References

External links
Official Site

Daily newspapers published in California
ER
MediaNews Group publications
Publications established in 1853
1853 establishments in California